Chano may refer to:

People
Chano (footballer, born 1961), Spanish footballer
Chano (footballer, born 1965), Spanish footballer
Sebastián Rodríguez Veloso (nickname Chano, born 1957), Spanish Paralympic swimmer
Chance the Rapper (nickname Chano, born 1993), American hip hop recording artist

Given name
Chano Domínguez (born 1960), Spanish jazz pianist
Chano Lobato (1927-2009), Spanish flamenco singer
Chano Pozo (1915-1948), Cuban jazz composer and percussionist
Chano Urueta (1904-1979), Mexican film director

Surname
Takayuki Chano (born 1976), Japanese retired footballer

Places
Chano (Peranzanes), a village in the municipality of Peranzanes, Spain

See also

Chanos (disambiguation)
Chana (disambiguation)